The gymnastics competitions in the 1985 Summer Universiade were held in Kobe, Japan.

Men's events

Women's events

References
 Universiade gymnastics medalists on HickokSports
 Universiade gymnastics medalists on sports123.com

1985 in gymnastics
1985 Summer Universiade
Gymnastics at the Summer Universiade